Northcentral University is a private online university with its headquarters in San Diego, California.  It was established in 1996 and is classified among "D/PU: Doctoral/Professional Universities"; it offers bachelor's, master's, specialist, and doctoral degrees. NCU was acquired by the National University System in 2019.

History
Northcentral University was founded in 1996 by Donald Hecht as a private for-profit university.

In 1978, Hecht had established California Southern University, formerly known as Southern California University for Professional Studies (SCUPS).
 
In 2003 the university received regional accreditation from The Higher Learning Commission.  Four years later, the institution moved its headquarters to Prescott, Arizona. In that same year, the school received ACBSP accreditation.  Shortly thereafter, on October 8, 2008, Northcentral announced the university was being purchased by Rockbridge Growth Equity, LLC.

In 2011 the US Department of Education determined Northcentral was one of 75 US institutions failing its 2009-2010 financial responsibility test (a measure of the institution's financial solvency), and would be required to post a letter of credit in order for students to receive federal financial aid. Northcentral also failed its 2010–2011, 2011-2012 and 2012-2013 financial responsibility tests, scoring zero for 2010–2011 on a scale of -1 to 3, lower than the 0.2 it earned the prior term; 0.2 for 2011–2012; and 0.2 again for 2012–2013.  In 2015 the US Department of Education placed Northcentral on "HCM-Cash Monitoring 1" status because of its financial issues.

In 2019, the National University System (California) acquired Northcentral University, in effect, converting Northcentral University into a non-profit institution.

Academics
Northcentral University consists of six schools:
 School of Law (Degrees offered: JD, BA, Undergraduate Certificate in Paralegal Studies)
 School of Business (Degrees offered: BBA, MBA, MSOL, MSA, DPA, DBA, PhD; Post-Baccalaureate and Post-Master's certifications in Business)
 School of Technology (Degrees offered: MS and PhD)
 School of Education (Degrees offered: MAT, MEd, MS-ID, EdS, EdD, EdD-ID, PhD, PhD-ID; Post-Baccalaureate and Post-Master's certifications in Education)
 School of Health Sciences (Degrees offered: MHA, DHA, MSN, DNP)
 School of Social and Behavioral Sciences (Department of Psychology – Degrees offered: BA, MA, MS and PhD in psychology; Post-Baccalaureate and Post-Master's certifications. Department of Marriage and Family Sciences – Degrees offered: MA, DMFT and PhD in Marriage and Family Therapy; Post-Baccalaureate and Post-Master's certifications

Accreditation and certifications
Northcentral is accredited by the Western Association of Schools and Colleges; the institution was previously accredited by the Higher Learning Commission.  The university's business school is accredited by the Accreditation Council for Business Schools and Programs (ACBSP).  The university's master's and PhD programs in Marriage & Family Therapy are accredited by the American Association for Marriage and Family Therapy.

Northcentral University is also recognized as a Registered Education Provider (REP) at the Global Provider Enrollment Level by Project Management Institute and offers project management degrees at the bachelor, master, and doctoral levels.

The JFK School of Law at NCU was placed on probation by The State Bar of California, through its Committee of Bar Examiners, due to reporting a five-year cumulative bar exam pass rate (MPR) of 39.7 percent for 2020, when a minimum of 40 percent is required under Rule 4.160(N); the law school raised its MPR to 41.9 percent as of July 1, 2021, and its probation was lifted.

Rankings
 Ranked 148th out of 205 on U.S. News Best Online Programs ranking for its Bachelors Programs among National Universities in 2013 "U.S. News Best College Rankings".

References

External links
 Official website
 

Private universities and colleges in Arizona
Private universities and colleges in California
Distance education institutions based in the United States
Educational institutions established in 1996
1996 establishments in Arizona
Rock Ventures